Expert Review of Hematology is a MEDLINE-indexed, peer-reviewed, international medical journal publishing review articles and original papers on all aspects of hematology. It is part of the Expert Review series, published by Informa.

The journal provides commentary and analysis to elucidate best clinical practice in hematology and to translate advances in research – in areas such as immunology, stem cell research, and cell and gene therapy – into the clinical context. Each review includes an ‘expert commentary’ and a 'five-year view' section, in which authors are asked to provide their personal view on the current status and future direction of the research discussed.

The journal is aided by an international editorial advisory board of experts practicing within the field.

Expert Review of Hematology is currently in its 7th year of publication, has an Impact Factor of 2.07, and is available online or is published in paper format 12 times a year.

Issue Contents 

 Reviews
 Original Research Papers
 Perspectives
 Special Reports
 Drug Profiles
 Device Profiles
 Editorials
 Key Paper Evaluations
 Meeting Reports
 Clinical Trial Reports

Key Areas of Coverage 

 Acute leukemias
 Anemias
 Bleeding disorders
 Bone marrow and hematopoietic stem cell transplantation
 Cellular disorders
 Chronic leukemias
 Disorders of iron metabolism
 Hodgkins disease
 Infection in hematology
 Immunodeficiency syndromes
 Autoimmune diseases
 Marrow failure syndromes
 Multiple myeloma and amyloidosis
 Neutropenia
 Non-Hodgkin lymphomas
 Pediatric hematology
 Platelet disorders
 Thrombosis and hemostasis
 Transfusion medicine

External links 
 Official website
 Informa Healthcare website

References 

Hematology journals
English-language journals
Expert Review journals